An elastic artery (conducting artery or conduit artery) is an artery with many collagen and  elastin filaments in the tunica media, which gives it the ability to stretch in response to each pulse.  This elasticity also gives rise to the Windkessel effect, which helps to maintain a relatively constant pressure in the arteries despite the pulsating nature of the blood flow. Elastic arteries include the largest arteries in the body, those closest to the heart. They give rise to medium-sized vessels known as distributing arteries (or muscular arteries).

The pulmonary arteries, the aorta, and its branches together comprise the body's system of elastic arteries.

Elastic arteries receive their own blood supply by the vasa vasorum unlike smaller blood vessels, which are supplied by diffusion.

Examples are: aorta, brachiocephalic, common carotids, subclavian, common iliac.

References

External links
 
 Histology at usc.edu

Arteries